Missouri is the 30th richest state in the United States of America, with a per capita income of $19,936 (2000).

Missouri counties ranked by per capita income

Note: Data is from the 2010 United States Census Data and the 2006-2010 American Community Survey 5-Year Estimates.

References

Missouri
Economy of Missouri
Income